Eastern Technical High School (ETHS) is a 1997, 2009, and 2010 Maryland Blue Ribbon High School, a 2010 National Blue Ribbon High School, and a 1999 USDE New American High School located in Essex, Baltimore County, Maryland, United States. 

Eastern Technical High School used to be known as Eastern Vocational Technical High School (EVT, Eastern Voc-Tech), but due to lack of participation in the vocational program and an increased demand for technology education, the vocational program was removed and the school was renamed in 1994. Unlike the other high schools in the area, Eastern Tech is not districted – it is not a "home" high school for any students regardless of location. All students must apply, take an entrance exam, and meet certain standards for acceptance to the school.

Academics
Along with their regular classes, students enrolled at this magnet school participate in a career major of their choosing. Academic areas include Allied Health, Construction Management, Culinary Arts, Engineering Careers, Information Technology, Law and Public Policy, Interactive Media Production, and the Teacher Academy of Maryland. The school features a variety of sports teams for both girls and boys. In addition, the school offers various clubs like the National Honor Society, Student Government Association, Math, Social Studies, Music, English, Spanish, and Science Honor Societies, Future Business Leaders of America, Red Cross Society, a concert band, yearly drama productions by the Theater Club, and other such organizations.

Eastern Technical High school received a 74.6 out of a possible 82.5 points (90%) on the 2018-2019 Maryland State Department of Education Report Card and received a 5 out of 5 star rating, ranking in the 99th percentile among all Maryland schools.

On April 29, 2021, USNews ranked Eastern Tech as #132 high school in the nation.

Students
The 2019–2020 enrollment at Eastern Technical High School was 1172 students.

Athletics

Eastern Technical High School is known for the success of several of its sports teams.

In 2005, the Varsity Baseball Team won the school's first ever State Championship. Just a few months later, the Girls Varsity Soccer Team Won the second. [1]

Eastern Tech lacks a 400-meter track as well as the number of fields that many high schools have and, as a result, many teams practice on other campuses around the Essex area, such as the neighboring Kenwood High School or CCBC Essex. 

The school's mascot is the Maverick. The school colors are orange and black.

State Championships
Football
2A 2009
John H. Cox Football Sportsmanship Award 2009 
Girls Soccer
2A 2005
Boys Soccer
2A 2017
Wrestling
Class AA-A 1987
Baseball
2A 2005, 2007
Softball
2A 2014

Notable alumni
 Timothy R. Ferguson, Former Maryland State Senator
 Rudy Gay, current NBA basketball player, attended Eastern Tech High School for 2 years
 Ego Nwodim, current Saturday Night Live cast member

See also

List of high schools in Maryland

References

External links
Eastern Technical High School
Baltimore County Public Schools

Educational institutions established in 1970
Essex, Maryland
Public high schools in Maryland
Baltimore County Public Schools
Middle States Commission on Secondary Schools
Magnet schools in Maryland
1970 establishments in Maryland